The Kaohsiung Veterans General Hospital (KSVGH) is a hospital in Zuoying District, Kaohsiung, Taiwan.

History
The hospital was opened in 1990.

Transportation
The hospital is accessible within walking distance east of Ecological District Station of Kaohsiung MRT.

See also
 List of hospitals in Taiwan

References

External links

 

1990 establishments in Taiwan
Hospitals established in 1990
Hospitals in Kaohsiung